HD 175541 is an 8th magnitude star with an exoplanetary companion in the constellation Serpens. It has the proper name Kaveh, which was selected by Iran during the NameExoWorlds campaign as part of the 100th anniversary of the IAU.  Kaveh is one of the heroes of Shahnameh. The apparent visual magnitude of 8.02 is too faint for this star to be visible in the naked eye. It is located at a distance of approximately 424 light years from the Sun based on parallax measurements, and is drifting further away with a radial velocity of +20 km/s. Despite its distance, it was given the number 736 in the Gliese Catalogue of Nearby Stars.

This is an evolved G-type star with a stellar classification of G6/8IV. The absolute magnitude of 2.54 places it 3.5 magnitudes above the comparable main sequence stars in the Sun's neighborhood, indicating that it is on the subgiant branch. When this intermediate-mass star was on the main-sequence, it was an A-type star. It is around three billion years old and is chromospherically inactive with low a projected rotational velocity of 0.5 km/s. The star has 1.45 times the mass and has expanded to 4.1 times the radius of the Sun. It is radiating ten times the luminosity of the Sun from its photosphere at an effective temperature of 5,093 K.

In April 2007, a Jovian planet was found orbiting this star using the radial velocity method, from Lick and Keck Observatories in Mount Hamilton (California) and Mauna Kea (Hawai'i), United States.

See also
 HD 192699
 HD 210702
 List of extrasolar planets

References

 

G-type subgiants
Planetary systems with one confirmed planet

Serpens (constellation)
Durchmusterung objects
0736
175541
092895